In the NUTS (Nomenclature of Territorial Units for Statistics) codes of Spain (ES), the following are the first-level political and administrative divisions.

Overall

NUTS Codes

Local administrative units

Below the NUTS levels, the two LAU (Local Administrative Units) levels are:

The LAU codes of Spain can be downloaded here:

NUTS codes

Older Codes 
In the 2003 version, the two provinces of the Canary Islands were coded as follows:

See also
 Subdivisions of Spain
 ISO 3166-2 codes of Spain
 FIPS region codes of Spain

Sources
 Hierarchical list of the Nomenclature of territorial units for statistics - NUTS and the Statistical regions of Europe
 Overview map of EU Countries - NUTS level 1
 ESPANA - NUTS level 2
 ESPANA - NUTS level 3
 Correspondence between the NUTS levels and the national administrative units
 List of current NUTS codes
 Download current NUTS codes (ODS format)
 Provinces of Spain, Statoids.com

Spain
Spain
Nuts